The Flock is the self-titled debut album by the Flock. It was released in 1969.

Track listing
All songs written by the Flock, except as noted.
Side One
"Introduction" – 4:50
"Clown" – 7:42
"I Am the Tall Tree" – 5:37
 "Tired of Waiting" – (Ray Davies) – 4:35

Side Two
"Store Bought - Store Thought" – 7:00
"Truth" – 15:25

Personnel
"Introduction"
 Fred Glickstein - guitar
 Jerry Goodman - violin
"Clown"
 Fred Glickstein - guitar, lead vocals
 Jerry Goodman - violin, backing vocals, guitar
 Tom Webb - tenor saxophone
 Rick Canoff - tenor saxophone, backing vocals
 Frank Posa - trumpet
 Jerry Smith - bass, backing vocals
 Ron Karpman - drums
"I Am the Tall Tree"
 Fred Glickstein - 12-string acoustic guitar, lead vocals
 Jerry Goodman - violin, backing vocals
 Tom Webb - tenor saxophone
 Rick Canoff - tenor saxophone, backing vocals
 Frank Posa - trumpet
 Jerry Smith - bass, backing vocals
 Ron Karpman - drums
"Tired of Waiting"
 Fred Glickstein - guitar, lead vocals
 Jerry Goodman - violin, backing vocals
 Tom Webb - maracas
 Rick Canoff - tenor saxophone
 Frank Posa - trumpet
 Jerry Smith - bass, backing vocals
 Ron Karpman - drums
"Store Bought - Store Thought
 Fred Glickstein - 6-string electric and 12-string acoustic guitars, lead vocals
 Jerry Goodman - guitar, backing vocals
 Tom Webb - tenor saxophone, backing vocals, flute
 Rick Canoff - tenor saxophone, backing vocals
 Frank Posa - trumpet
 Jerry Smith - bass, backing vocals
 Ron Karpman - drums
"Truth"
 Fred Glickstein - guitar, lead vocals
 Jerry Goodman - violin
 Tom Webb - harmonica, tenor saxophone
 Rick Canoff - tenor saxophone
 Frank Posa - trumpet
 Jerry Smith - bass
 Ron Karpman - drums

See also
Constantin Astori, whose artwork was used on the album cover

References

External links
The Flock/Dinosaur Swamps - both albums in one

The Flock (band) albums
1969 debut albums